Nay Zar Lin Lin Aung (born 2 December 1983) is a Burmese former footballer who played as a defender. She has been a member of the Myanmar women's national team.

International career
Nay Zar Lin Lin Aung capped for Myanmar at senior level during the 2010 AFC Women's Asian Cup.

References

1983 births
Living people
Women's association football defenders
Burmese women's footballers
Myanmar women's international footballers